Trechiotes is a genus of beetles in the family Carabidae, containing the following species:

 Trechiotes embersoni Deuve, 1995
 Trechiotes perroti Jeannel, 1954
 Trechiotes qiannanicus Deuve & Tian, 1999

References

Trechinae